"Dreaming" is a song by English electronic band Orchestral Manoeuvres in the Dark initially released in January 1988 as a single from their compilation album, The Best of OMD.

It was a hit in the United States, reaching number 16 on the Billboard Hot 100, number 17 on the Cashbox Top 100 and number 6 on the Dance chart. The track had limited success in the band's home country where it peaked at number 50 on the UK Singles Chart, while it entered the Top 40 in several other countries including Australia, New Zealand and Germany. The single was re-released in the UK in June 1988 in new 7" gatefold and CD single as well as 12" formats, reaching this time number 60 on the national chart.

The cover art was designed by Stylorouge, with photography by Andrew Catlin.

Until OMD's reformation in 2010, "Dreaming" was the last single to feature the group's original line-up; lead singer Andy McCluskey was the only core member to appear on their 1991–1996 output. McCluskey performed the song live during the 1990s when Humphreys was no longer in the group.

Reception
Stewart Mason, in a retrospective review for AllMusic, described the song as "dynamite", and wrote: "['Dreaming'] is easily the group's best single since 1983's 'Telegraph'... It's a near-perfect pop song, perhaps the last great single by an '80s synth-pop band."

Conversely, McCluskey named "Dreaming" as a track he wishes OMD had never released, while criticising its lyrical content. KROQ ranked the song the 43rd-greatest of 1988; in a poll of 5,550 Slicing Up Eyeballs readers, it was voted the 62nd-best of the year.

B-sides
All the single versions include "Satellite" as a B-side. The other B-side, "Gravity Never Failed", was a bonus track on the 12" and CD single. This song was originally titled "Georgia" and dates back to the 1981 Architecture & Morality sessions. However, the band lost their favour with the song and was thus shelved, and the title "Georgia" was given to a new song and featured on the album. "Gravity Never Failed" has subsequently been included on CD re-issues of the Architecture & Morality album (2003 & 2007), as well as on the Navigation: The OMD B-Sides compilation album, unlike "Satellite", which remains unique to this release.

Track listing
 7" Single AM-03002 (US)
 "Dreaming" – 3:54
 "Satellite" – 5:10

Special Limited Edition UPC5012980098781  10"(UK)
 "Dreaming" (The William Orbit Remix) – 7:15
 "Dreaming" (7" Version) – 3:56
 "Messages" – 4:41
 "Secret" – 3:57

12-Inch Single SP 0-12258 (US)
 "Dreaming" (Club Mix) – 7:13
 "Dreaming" (Radio Edit)-3:54
 "Dreaming" (Dub Mix)-4:29
 "Satellite" – 5:10

CD Mini Single Gatefold CSIG 000051 2 (US)
 "Dreaming" – 4:00
 "Gravity Never Failed" – 3:27 	
 "Secret (12" Mix)-6:15

Official versions

Charts

References

1988 singles
Orchestral Manoeuvres in the Dark songs
Songs written by Paul Humphreys
Songs written by Andy McCluskey
1988 songs
Virgin Records singles